The Torbay and Brixham Railway was a  broad gauge railway in England which linked the Dartmouth and Torbay Railway at Churston railway station, Devon with the important fishing port of Brixham. It was a little over two miles long. Never more than a local branch line, it closed in 1963.

Construction
In the middle of the nineteenth century Brixham was an important fishing port, but as railways were constructed they were slow to reach the town. The South Devon Railway (SDR) opened its line to Newton Abbot—the station was called simply Newton at first—on 31 December 1846, and to a Torquay station—now renamed Torre—on 18 December 1848. It was some time before the line was extended, and it fell to a nominally independent company, the Dartmouth and Torbay Railway (D&TR) to build from Torre to Brixham Road station, later renamed , opening to there on 1 April 1861.

Seeing that the railway connection at "Brixham Road" was close, but inconvenient, a local solicitor and proprietor of the fishing harbour, Richard Walter Wolston, set about obtaining support for a line connecting Brixham itself. Largely by his efforts, the Torbay and Brixham Railway Company was incorporated by Act of Parliament on 25 July 1864 or 26 July 1864; together with a tramway in connection with the railway. The company's share capital was £18,000 and Wolston himself subscribed £17,700. The contractor defaulted during construction, but largely due to Wolston's personal and financial resources, it was completed, and opened on 28 February 1868 to passengers, goods traffic being handled from 1 May 1868. The line was 2m 6c (3.3 km) in length.

Operation
Wolston obtained the small locomotive Queen second hand, but the line was worked by the South Devon Railway (SDR) at first. As well as passenger traffic, there was a dominant trade in fish. However Wolston was later in dispute with that Company over the setting of commission for connecting traffic. Even though that issue was corrected, the T&BR taking over the operation itself for a time, the line ran at a financial loss. The SDR had amalgamated with the GWR and the Bristol and Exeter Railway in 1876—the combined company maintained the name Great Western Railway.

At this time the T&BR took over the operation of its line independently, and evidently the GWR was supportive in this, lending them a relief locomotive when Queen was out of service. In January 1877 the GWR sold another small engine, Raven, to the T&BR.

It proved impossible to sustain the independent existence of the T&BR, and a sale to the GWR was agreed on 19 May 1882; the sale took effect on 1 January 1883, for £12,000.

Subsequent history of the line
Now simply a remote branch of the GWR, the line continued in use. It was carried out between 20 May 1892 and 23 May 1892.

The rise of road transport focussed the uneconomic nature of the branch, and it was closed to all traffic in 1963.

Brixham station

The railway station had a single platform and a goods shed opposite. An engine shed and another small goods yard were situated at the Churston end of the station. It was constructed on the hill above the town in order that the gradients between Brixham and Churston were not too steep.

Brixham station became 'Roxham station' for The System, a 1964 film. An scene early in the film sees most of the main characters at the station, either arriving on a train hauled by a British Rail Class 22 locomotive or waiting there to see who is arriving in the town for a holiday.

Locomotives

Queen

Queen was built in 1852 by E. B. Wilson and Company and was used for several years at the Isle of Portland in the construction of a breakwater for the harbour there.

Although the railway was initially worked by the South Devon Railway, the Torbay and Brixham Railway purchased this little locomotive to haul the trains. The South Devon Railway were to pay £3 per day for the facility, but the railway soon had to mortgage Queen to the South Devon for £350 to cover its debt to that company. In 1883 it passed to the Great Western Railway, which immediately withdrew it from service.

King

A second locomotive was ordered by the Torbay and Brixham Railway for the South Devon Railway, but in fact the latter company paid for it and it worked in its fleet. See South Devon Railway 2-4-0 locomotives for further information.

Raven

Raven had been built for the South Devon Railway as part of their Raven class for shunting dockside lines at Plymouth . In 1877, now also carrying their number 2175, it was sold by the Great Western Railway to the Torbay and Brixham to assist Queen.

Great Western locomotives
After 1883 the Great Western Railway provided various small locomotives from its fleet to operate the Brixham branch. Up until 1892 broad gauge locomotives employed were typically the ex-South Devon Railway 2-4-0 Prince and members of the GWR Hawthorn Class 2-4-0T type .

After the line was converted to standard gauge on 23 May 1892 a number of small tank locomotives, including the unique 4-4-0ST no. 13 were used on the line. In later years standard GWR 1400 Class 0-4-2Ts worked the autotrain. The final trains were worked by British Rail Class 122 single-car DMUs.

Revival plans
The Association of Train Operating Companies in 2009 indicated that Brixham would benefit from a passenger railway service. The First Great Western service to Paignton would be extended to Churston station on the Paignton and Dartmouth Steam Railway, a heritage railway. However the study (Connecting Communities: Expanding Access to the Rail Network) did not indicate a source of funding, and despite showing a timeline of two years to implementation, at April 2014 no progress has been made.

References

Further reading

 John Dilley, Mr Wolston's Little Line : The Story of the Torbay & Brixham Railway, self-published by John Dilley, Paignton, Devon, 1990,  

7 ft gauge railways
Broad gauge (7 feet) railway locomotives
Rail transport in Devon
Great Western Railway constituents
Railway companies established in 1864
Railway lines opened in 1868
Railway companies disestablished in 1883
Brixham
British companies disestablished in 1883
British companies established in 1864